KMXY (104.3 FM) is a radio station broadcasting a Hot Adult Contemporary format. Licensed to serve Grand Junction, Colorado, United States, it serves the Grand Junction area. The station is currently owned by Townsquare Media, through licensee Townsquare License, LLC.

External links

MXY
Radio stations established in 1977
Townsquare Media radio stations